The Hoa people (Vietnamese: Người Hoa,  or ) are citizens of Vietnam of full or partial Chinese origin. Chinese migration into Vietnam dates back millennia but Hoa today mostly refers to people of Chinese heritage from the 18th century who especially came from southern Chinese provinces. They are an ethnic minority group in Vietnam and a part of the overseas Chinese community and can be found elsewhere also, such as in the Americas. They may also be called "Chinese-Vietnamese" or "Chinese people living in/from Vietnam" by the Vietnamese, Chinese diaspora and Overseas Vietnamese.

Historically, ancient Chinese brought cultural, religious and philosophical thought to Vietnam, where the Vietnamese gradually developed and adapted on its own. Beginning as early as the 19th century, the Hoa people were known during the French Indochina era for being favoured by the French colonial rulers. Despite subsequent backlash that followed this, the Hoa community still exists in contemporary Vietnamese society today, either as descendants of Han Chinese who have immigrated to Vietnam over the nation's history or as more recent immigrants.

During prehistoric times in the Red River Delta basin, there were two language main language families present. One being the Austroasiatic family from which the native modern Vietnamese language is descended and the other being influenced by the Sino-Tibetan culture and language brought by immigrants speaking Chinese to Vietnam.

Hoa, those of more recent Chinese extraction from around the 18th century, played a leading role in Vietnam's private business sector before the end of the Vietnam War in 1975 and the reunification of Vietnam. However, many Hoa people from South Vietnam had their businesses and property confiscated by the North Vietnamese Communist Party after 1975 and fled the country, as well as the South Vietnamese who faced persecution by the Communist Government. This was then intensified during the Sino-Vietnamese War. From the Vietnamese Communist government point of view, the Chinese disloyal to Vietnam were regarded with deep suspicion, and had potentially teamed up with the French occupiers in seizing control of Vietnam's resources and labour, an almost repeat of the forces of Japanese imperialism leading to the Vietnamese famine of 1945, resulting in 2 million deaths of the Vietnamese populace.

From the late 19th century, the Hoa played a leading role in Vietnam's private business sector before the Fall of Saigon in 1975. They were a well-established middle class ethnic group and made up a high percentage of Vietnam's upper class. Despite their small numbers, the Hoa were disproportionately dominant in the Vietnamese economy having started an estimated 70 to 80 per cent of pre-fall of Saigon's privately owned and operated businesses. Communist intervention was then deemed necessary by wide swathes of the Vietnamese population and is considered to be an ingrained symbol of the Vietnamese identity by some. Many Hoa had their businesses and property confiscated by the Communists after 1975, and many fled the country as boat people due to persecution by the newly established Communist government. Hoa persecution intensified in the late 1970s, which was one of the underlying reasons for the Sino-Vietnamese War. The Vietnamese government's post-1988 shift to economic liberalization has revived the entrepreneurial presence of the predominantly urban Chinese minority allowing them reassert some of their previous economic clout in the Vietnamese economy, despite no longer dominate the economy because of the fierce competition with North Vietnamese people. Contemporary Hoa economic clout however pales in comparison to the old days, where Vietnam has mostly diversified its economy, allowing global corporations to operate within Vietnam.

Migration history

Early history

According to folklore, prior to Chinese domination of northern and north-central Vietnam, the region was ruled by a series of kingdoms called Văn Lang with a hierarchical government, headed by Lạc kings (Hùng kings), who were served by Lạc hầu and Lạc tướng. In approximately 257 BCE, Văn Lang was purportedly annexed by the Âu Việt state of Nam Cương. These Âu Việt people inhabited the southern part of the Zuo River, the drainage basin of the You River and the upstream areas of the Lô, Gâm, and Cầu Rivers, according to Đào Duy Anh. The leader of the Âu Việt, Thục Phán, overthrew the last Hùng kings, and unified the two kingdoms, establishing the Âu Lạc polity and proclaiming himself King An Dương (An Dương Vương).

In 179 BC, the Âu Lạc Kingdom was annexed by Nanyue, which ushered in more than a millennium of Chinese domination. Zhao Tuo incorporated the regions into Nanyue but left the indigenous chiefs in control of the population. This was the first time the region formed part of a polity headed by a Chinese ruler, Zhao Tuo posted two legates to supervise the Âu Lạc lords, one in the Red River Delta, named Giao Chỉ, and one in the Mã and Cả River, named Cửu Chân. although we do not know if the locals agreed with this nomenclature or if they were even aware of it. It appears that these legates are mainly interested in trade; and their influence was limited outside outposts.

In 111 BC, the Han dynasty conquered Nanyue and ruled it for the next several hundred years. The Han dynasty organized Nanyue into seven commanderies of the south (Lingnan) and now included three in Vietnam alone: Giao Chỉ and Cửu Chân, and a newly established Nhật Nam. Local Lạc lords, just as under Nanyue, acknowledged Han dominion to be granted authority. "Seals and ribbons" were bestowed upon the local leaders as their status symbol, in return, they paid "tribute to a suzerain" but the Han officials considered this as "taxes". During the first century of Chinese rule, Vietnam was governed leniently and indirectly with no immediate change in indigenous policies. Initially, indigenous Lac Viet people were governed at the local level but with indigenous Vietnamese local officials being replaced with newly settled Han Chinese officials. In fact, indigenous ways of life and ruling class did not experience major Sinitic impact, into the first century CE. Han imperial bureaucrats generally pursued a policy of peaceful relations with the indigenous population, focusing their administrative roles in the prefectural headquarters and garrisons, and maintaining secure river routes for trade. By the first century AD, however, the Han dynasty intensified its efforts to gain money from its new Vietnamese territories by raising taxes and instituting marriage and land inheritance reforms aimed at turning Vietnam into a patriarchal society more amenable to political authority. The native chief paid heavy tributes and imperial taxes to the Han mandarins to maintain the local administration and the military. The ancient Chinese vigorously tried to civilize the Vietnamese either through forced sinification or through brute Chinese political domination. The Han dynasty sought to assimilate the Vietnamese as the Chinese wanted to maintain a unified cohesive empire through a "civilizing mission" as the ancient Chinese regarded the Vietnamese as uncultured and backward barbarians with the Chinese regarding their "Celestial Empire" as the supreme center of the universe with a large amount of success. However, implementation of a foreign administrative system and sinicization was not easy as frequent uprisings and rebellions were indicative of Vietnamese resistance to these changes. Han immigration into Northern Vietnam was also not overwhelming during this time, and population levels were not affected until after the middle of the second century. While enough immigrants existed to form a coherent Han-Viet ruling-class, not enough existed to administratively or culturally dominate the indigenous society. In fact, it appears that "imperial law was never successfully imposed over the Vietnamese, and that during the post-Han era of the Six Dynasties, enfeebled imperial courts were repeatedly forced to compromise their authority and recognize the local power system in Vietnam". Meanwhile, Han colonial officials and settlers found themselves adopting local customs.

A Giao Chỉ prefect, Shi Xie, who was in the sixth generation from his ancestors who migrated to Northern Vietnam during the Wang Mang era, ruled Vietnam as an autonomous warlord for forty years and was posthumously deified by later Vietnamese monarchs. In the words of Stephen O'Harrow, Shi Xie was essentially "the first Vietnamese." His rule gave "formal legitimacy" to those identifying with interests of the local society than with the Chinese empire. And while the Chinese saw Shi Xie as "frontier guardian", the Vietnamese considered him the head of regional ruling-class society. According to Taylor (1983): 
A revolt against China was mounted by Ly Bon, whose ancestors were also among the Chinese who fled south to escape the disorders of Wang Mang's usurpation, in the fifth century.

Attempts to civilize the Vietnamese were failed and there was more 'Vietnamization' of Chinese of Vietnamese ancestry than assimilation of the Vietnamese in the first six centuries of Chinese rule. The Chinese of Vietnamese ancestry became assimilated while still maintaining their Chinese identity with the native people and absorbed into the "social, economic and political environment" in Northern Vietnam. The insight, skills, customs, and ideas brought in by the Chinese allowed the native to develop an identity, making the probability of their being assimilated to Chinese and Chinese intrusion lower. The strength of localization in ancient Vietnam has thus been widely noted. The policy of assimilation was continually enforced over the 1,000 years of Chinese rule of Vietnam until the Ngô dynasty when the Vietnamese regained their independence from China. The Vietnamese rulers deported some 87,000 Chinese nationals, although a smaller minority applied for permanent residency in Vietnam. Chinese who chose to remain in Vietnam chose to assimilate. The Vietnamese were wedded with Chinese peasantry that later became gentry of Vietnam.

After independence 

Sporadic Chinese migration into Vietnam continued between the 9th and 15th centuries AD. The Vietnamese court during the Lý dynasty and the Trần dynasty welcomed ethnic Chinese scholars and officials to fill into its administrative and bureaucratic ranks, but these migrants had to renounce their Chinese identity and assimilate into Vietnamese society. The Vietnamese court also allowed Chinese refugees, which consisted of civilian and military officials with their family members to seek asylum in Vietnam. However, these Chinese settlers were not allowed to change their place of residence without the Court's permission and were also required to adopt Vietnamese dress and culture. During the Early Lê dynasty some Chinese were captured in 995 after the Vietnamese raided the border. During the Lý dynastyVietnam raided Song dynasty China to enslave Chinese, who were forced to serve in the Vietnamese army as soldiers. In 1050, the Cham dedicated some Chinese slaves to their goddess Lady Po Nagar at the Po Nagar temple complex, along with Thai, Khmer and Burmese slaves. It has been speculated by Professor Kenneth Hall that these slaves were war captives taken by the Cham from the port of Panduranga after the Cham conquered the port and enslaved all of its inhabitants, including foreigners living there. In the South, the Daoyi Zhilue also mentioned Chinese merchants who went to Cham ports in Champa, married Cham women, to whom they regularly returned to after trading voyages. One notable example of such intermarriages was Chinese merchant from Quanzhou, Wang Yuanmao, who in the 12th century traded extensively with Champa and married a Cham princess. Chinese prisoners were returned to China for captured districts in 1078 after China defeated Đại Việt and overran several of Cao Bằng Province's districts.

The founder of the Lý dynasty, Lý Thái Tổ (Lý Công Uẩn) 李公蘊, has been ascribed of having origins from Fujian Province somewhere in his paternal bloodline while little is known about his maternal side except for the fact that his mother was a woman named Phạm Thị. Very few direct details about his parents are known, however, the ethnic Chinese background of Lý Công Uẩn (李公蘊 [Hokkien POJ: Lí kong ùn]), at least on his paternal side has been accepted by Vietnamese historian Trần Quốc Vượng.

The ancestors of the Trần clan originated from the province of Fujian before they migrated under Trần Kinh (陳京, [Hokkien POJ: Tân Kiaⁿ / King]) to Đại Việt, where their mixed-blooded descendants established the Trần dynasty which ruled Đại Việt. The descendants of the Trần clan who came to rule Đại Việt were of mixed-blooded descent due to many intermarriages between the Trần and several royal members of the Lý dynasty alongside members of their royal court as in the case of Trần Lý and Trần Thừa, the latter whose son Trần Thái Tông would later become the first emperor of the Trần dynasty. Their descendants established the Tran dynasty, which ruled Vietnam (Dai Viet). Some of the mixed-blooded descendants and certain members of the clan could still speak Chinese, as when a Yuan dynasty envoy met with the Chinese-speaking Tran Prince Trần Quốc Tuấn in 1282. The first of the Trần clan to live in Đại Việt was Trần Kinh, who settled in Tức Mặc village (now Mỹ Lộc, Nam Định) who lived by fishing.

Professor Liam Kelley noted that people from Song dynasty China like Zhao Zhong and Xu Zongdao fled to Tran dynasty ruled Vietnam after the Mongol invasion of the Song. The ancestor of the Tran, Trần Kinh had originated from the present-day Fujian Province of China as did the Daoist cleric Xu Zongdao who recorded the Mongol invasion and referred to them as "Northern bandits". He quoted the Đại Việt Sử Ký Toàn Thư which said "When the Song [Dynasty] was lost, its people came to us. Nhật Duật took them in. There was Zhao Zhong who served as his personal guard. Therefore, among the accomplishments in defeating the Yuan [i.e., Mongols], Nhật Duật had the most".

Southern Song Chinese military officers and civilian officials left to overseas countries, went to Vietnam and intermarried with the Vietnamese ruling elite and went to Champa to serve the government there as recorded by Zheng Sixiao. Southern Song soldiers were part of the Vietnamese army prepared by emperor Trần Thánh Tông against the second Mongol invasion.

A Vietnamese woman and a Chinese man were the parents of Phạm Nhan (Nguyễn Bá Linh). He fought against the Tran for the Yuan dynasty. Dong Trieu was his mother's place.

Fujian was the origin of the ethnic Chinese Tran who migrated to Vietnam along with a large amount of other Chinese during the Ly dynasty where they served as officials. Distinct Chinese last names are found in the Tran and Ly dynasty Imperial examination records. Ethnic Chinese are recorded in Tran and Ly dynasty records of officials. Clothing, food and language were all Chinese dominated in Van Don where the Tran had moved to after leaving their home province of Fujian. The Chinese language could still be spoken by the Tran in Vietnam. The ocean side area of Vietnam was colonized by Chinese migrants from Fujian which included the Tran among them located to the capital's southeastern area. The Red River Delta was subjected to migration from Fujian including the Tran and Van Don port arose as a result of this interaction. Guangdong and Fujian Chinese moved to the Halong located Van Don coastal port during Ly Anh Tong's rule in order to engage in commerce. The usurpation of the Ly occurred after they married with the fishing Fujianese Tran family.

China's province of Zhejiang around the 940s was the origin of the Chinese Hồ/Hú family from which Hồ dynasty founder Emperor Hồ Quý Ly came from.

The Chinese elites who were descended from mixed marriages between Chinese and Vietnamese viewed others as beneath them and inferior due to Chinese influence.

While the Kinh Vietnamese are heavily influenced by Chinese culture and carry unrelated variants of O-M7 haplogroup, Cham people carry the patrilineal R-M17 haplogroup of South Asian Indian origin from South Asian merchants spreading Hinduism to Champa and marrying Cham females since Chams have no matrilineal South Asian mtdna and this fits with the matrilocal structure of Cham families. Analysis of Vietnamese Kinh people's genetics show that within the last 800 years there was mixture between a Southeast Asian-like ancestral component and a related ancestral component to Chinese component that happens to fit the time period in which Kinh expanded south from their Red river delta homeland in Nam tiến which also matches the event 700 years ago when the Cham population suffered massive losses. With the exception of Cham who are Austronesian speaking and Mang who are Austroasiatic speaking, the southern Han Chinese and all other ethnic groups in Vietnam share ancestry.

Early immigration: 15th–18th centuries

Lê dynasty
 
After the Fourth Chinese domination of Vietnam it was recorded that the union of Vietnamese women and Chinese (Ngô) men produced offspring which were left behind in Vietnam and the Chams, Cẩu Hiểm, Laotians, these people and Vietnamese natives who collaborated with the Ming were made into slaves of the Le government in the Complete Annals of Đại Việt.

There was no mandatory required reparation of the voluntarily remaining Ming Chinese in Vietnam. The return of the Ming Chinese to China was commanded by the Ming and not Le Loi. The Trai made up the supporters of Le Loi in his campaign. He lived among the Trai at the border regions as their leader and seized the Ming-ruled lowland Kinh areas after originally forming his base in the southern highland regions. The southern dwelling Trai and Red River dwelling Vietnamese were in effect locked in a "civil war" during the anti-Ming rebellion by Le Loi.

The leader Lưu Bác Công (Liu Bogong) in 1437 commanded a Dai Viet military squad made out of ethnic Chinese since even after the independence of Dai Viet, Chinese remained behind. Vietnam received Chinese defectors from Yunnan in the 1400s.

The Vietnamese Ruler Le Thanh Tong cracked down on foreign contacts and enforced an isolationist policy. A large amount of trade between Guangzhou and Vietnam happened during this time. Early accounts recorded that the Vietnamese captured Chinese whose ships had blown off course and detained them. Young Chinese men were selected by the Vietnamese for castration to become eunuch slaves to the Vietnamese. It has been speculated by modern historians that Chinese who were captured and castrated by the Vietnamese were involved in regular trade between China and Vietnam instead of being blown off course, and that they were punished after a Vietnamese crackdown on trade with foreign countries.

A 1499 entry in the Ming Shilu recorded that thirteen Chinese men from Wenchang including a young man named Wu Rui were captured by the Vietnamese after their ship was blown off course while traveling from Hainan to Guangdong's Qin subprefecture (Qinzhou), after which they ended up near the coast of Vietnam, in the 1460s, during the Chenghua Emperor's rule (1464–1487). Twelve of them were enslaved to work as agricultural laborers, while the youngest Chinese man, Wu Rui (吳瑞) was selected by the Vietnamese court for castration since he was the only young man in among the thirteen and he became a eunuch at the Vietnamese imperial palace in Thang Long for nearly one fourth of a century. After years of serving the Vietnamese as a eunuch slave in the palace, he was promoted to a position with real power after the death of the Vietnamese ruler in 1497 to a military position in Northern Vietnam as military superintendent since his service in the palace was apparently valued by the Vietnamese. However the Lạng Sơn guard soldier Dương Tam tri (Yang Sanzhi) (楊三知) told him of an escape route back to China and Wu Rui escaped to Longzhou after walking for 9 days through the mountains. The local ethnic minority Tusi chief Wei Chen took him into custody, overruling objections from his family who wanted to send him back to Vietnam. Vietnam found out about his escape and sent an agent to buy Wu Rui back from Wei Chen with 100 Jin in payment since they were scared that Wu Rui would reveal Vietnamese state secrets to China. Wei Chen planned to sell him back to the Vietnamese but told them the amount they were offering was too little and demanded more however before they could agree on a price, Wu was rescued by the Pingxiang magistrate Li Guangning and then was sent to Beijing to work as a eunuch in the Ming palace at the Directorate of Ceremonial (silijian taijian 司禮監太監). The Đại Việt sử ký toàn thư records that in 1467 in An Bang province of Dai Viet (now Quảng Ninh Province) a Chinese ship blew off course onto the shore. The Chinese were detained and not allowed to return to China as ordered by Le Thanh Tong. This incident may be the same one where Wu Rui was captured.

A 1472 entry in the Ming Shilu reported that some Chinese from Nanhai escaped back to China after their ship had been blown off course into Vietnam, where they had been forced to serve as soldiers in Vietnam's military. The escapees also reported that they found out that more than 100 Chinese men remained captives in Vietnam after they were caught and castrated by the Vietnamese after their ships were blown off course into Vietnam in other incidents. The Chinese Ministry of Revenue responded by ordering Chinese civilians and soldiers to stop going abroad to foreign countries. These 100 men were taken prisoner around the same time as Wu Rui and the historian Leo K. Shin believes all of them may have been involved in illegal trade instead of being blown off course by wind. The over 100 Chinese men who were castrated and made into eunuchs by the Vietnamese remained captives in Vietnam when the incident was reported. Both the incidents of the young Chinese man Wu Rui and the more than 100 Chinese men being castrated and used as eunuchs point to possible involvement in trade according to historians John K. Whitmore and Tana Li which was then suppressed by the Vietnamese government instead of them really being blown off course by the wind. China's relations with Vietnam during this period were marked by the punishment of prisoners by castration.

Northern and Southern dynasties (1533–1597)

The Chinese living in the Mekong Delta area settled there before any Vietnamese settled in the region. When the Ming dynasty fell, several thousand Chinese refugees fled south and extensively settled on Cham lands and in Cambodia. Most of these Chinese were young males and they took Cham women as wives. Their children started to identify more with Chinese culture. This migration occurred in the 17th and 18th centuries. In the 17th century many Chinese men from southeastern Chinese provinces like Fujian continued to move to southeast Asia, including Vietnam, many of the Chinese married native women after settling down in places like Hội An.

In the 16th century, Lê Anh Tông of the Lê dynasty encouraged traders to visit Vietnam by opening up Thăng Long (Hanoi), Huế and Hội An. Chinese presence in the Huế/Hội An area dated back as early as 1444, when a monk from Fujian built the Buddhist temple, Chua Chuc Thanh. Hội An quickly developed into a trading port from the 16th century onwards, when Chinese and Japanese traders began to arrive in the city in greater numbers. When an Italian Jesuit priest, Father Christofo Borri, visited the city in 1618, he aptly described the city as: "The city of Faifo is so vast that one would think it is two juxtaposed cities; a Chinese city and a Japanese city." The Japanese traders quickly disappeared by the first half of the 17th century as Tokugawa shogunate imposed a policy of self-isolation and when Dutch traders such as Francisco Groemon  visited Hội An in 1642, the Japanese population was no more than 50 people, while the Chinese numbered some 5,000 individuals.

Restored Lê (1533–1789)
Han Chinese Ming dynasty refugees numbering 3,000 came to Vietnam at the end of the Ming dynasty. They opposed the Qing dynasty and were fiercely loyal to the Ming dynasty. Vietnamese women married these Han Chinese refugees since most of them were soldiers and single men. Their descendants became known as Minh Hương and they strongly identified as Chinese despite influence from Vietnamese mothers. They did not wear Manchu hairstyle unlike later Chinese migrants to Vietnam during the Qing dynasty.

Hội An was also the first city to take on refugees from the Ming dynasty following the Manchu conquest. An association for these refugees, commonly referred to as "Ming-Huong-Xa (明香社)" first appeared between 1645 and 1653. Around this time, Hội An and Vietnamese territories further south were under the control of the Nguyễn lords and the Nguyễn rulers allowed Vietnamese refugees to freely settle in disputed frontier lands with remnants of the Champa kingdom and the Khmer empire. According to the Dai Nam Chronicle, a Chinese general from Guangxi, Yang Yandi (Dương Ngạn Địch) led a band of 3,000 Ming loyalists to Huế to seek asylum. The Ming loyalist Chinese pirate Yang Yandi and his fleet sailed to Vietnam to leave the Qing dynasty in March 1682, first appearing off the coast of Tonkin in North Vietnam. According to the Vietnamese account, Vũ Duy Chí 武惟志, a minister of the Vietnamese Lê dynasty came up with a plan to defeat the Chinese pirates by sending more than 300 Vietnamese girls who were beautiful singing girls and prostitutes with red handkerchiefs to go to the Chinese pirate junks on small boats. The Chinese pirates and Northern Vietnamese girls had sex but the Vietnamese women then wet the gun barrels of the Chinese pirates ships with their handkerchiefs which they got wet. They then left in the same boats. The Vietnamese navy then attacked the Chinese pirate fleet which was unable to fire back with their wet guns. The Chinese pirate fleet, originally 206 junks, was reduced to 50-80 junks by the time it reached south Vietnam's Quảng Nam and the Mekong delta. The Chinese pirates having sex with North Vietnamese women may also have transmitted a deadly epidemic from China to the Vietnamese which ravaged the Tonkin regime of North Vietnam. French and Chinese sources say a typhoon contributed to the loss of ships along with the disease.

The Nguyễn court allowed Duong and his surviving followers to resettle in Đồng Nai, which had been newly acquired from the Khmers. Duong's followers named their settlement as "Minh Huong", to recall their allegiance to the Ming dynasty. More Chinese refugees followed suit to settle in Hội An and the frontier territory in Cochinchina such as Mạc Cửu, who had earlier settled in the Kampot–Hà Tiên area in the 1680s under the patronage of the Cambodian king, Chey Chettha IV. However, Cambodia fell into Thai rule under Taksin and, in 1708, Mạc Cửu switched his alliance to the Nguyễn lords, paying tribute to Huế. Mạc Cửu was given autonomy to rule Ha Tien in return for his tribute and throughout the 18th century, his descendants implemented their own administrative policies, independent of Huế and Cambodia. The presence of these semi-autonomous fiefdoms run by Chinese refugees encouraged more Chinese to settle in the South. In contrast, very few Chinese refugees chose to settle in territories controlled by the Trịnh lords, who still mandated Chinese refugees to strictly follow Vietnamese customs and refrain from contacts with the local Vietnamese populace in the cities.

Vietnamese women were wedded as wives of the Han Chinese Minh Hương 明鄉 who moved to Vietnam during the Ming dynasty's fall. They formed a new group of people in Vietnamese society and worked for the Nguyễn government. Both Khmer and Vietnamese wedded the Chinese men of the Minh Hương. Ha Tien came under the control of Mo Jiu (Ma Cuu), a Chinese who was among the Mekong Delta Ming migrants. Lang Cau, Cam Pho, Chiem, and Cu Lao in Hoi An were the sites of settlement by Minh Huong who were the result of native women becoming wives of Fujianese Chinese. The Minh Hương community descended from Vietnamese wedding youthful Chinese men in Cochinchina and Hoi An in Nguyễn lands. This new migration established a distinct Chinese diaspora group in Vietnam which was unlike in ancient times when the Vietnamese upper class absorbed ethnic Chinese who had come. Minh Hương were ethnically hybrid Chinese and Vietnamese descended from Chinese men and Vietnamese women. They lived in rural areas and urban areas. Chinese citizens in Vietnam were grouped as Huaqiao by the French while the Minh Huong were permanent residents of Vietnam who were ethnic Chinese. To make commerce easier, Vietnamese female merchants wedded Chinese male merchants wedded in Hoi An. Trần Thượng Xuyên and Yang Yandi (Dương Ngạn Địch) were two Chinese leaders who in 1679 brought Minh Huong to South Vietnam to live under the Nguyen Lords.

Chinese trade and immigration began to increase towards the earlier half of the 18th century as population and economic pressures encouraged more Chinese men to seek trade opportunities in Southeast Asia, including Vietnam. It was around this time that the descendants of the Ming Chinese refugees–often referred to as Ming Huong Chinese–begin to foster a separate ethnocultural identity for the newer Chinese immigrants, whom they refer to as "Thanh Nhan (清人)", or Qing people. The Thanh Nhan form independent Chinese associations along the same dialect group or clans in cities and towns where large populations prevail, including Cholon, Hội An and some towns in the Mekong Delta. The Minh Huong Chinese also formed similar associations, and notable examples include the Đình Minh Hương Gia Thạnh in Cholon, and the Dinh Tien Hien Lang Minh Huong in Hội An. Both groups of Chinese were also very active in the interior affairs of Vietnamese society; notable Minh Huong Chinese such as Trinh Hoai Duc and Ngo Nhan Tinh who became ministers under the Nguyễn court during Gia Long's reign. Many Thanh Nhan Chinese also participated as ragtag militia during the Tây Sơn rebellion, although their loyalties were divided based on their location of residence. The Thanh Nhan Chinese in Gia Định and Biên Hòa sided with Gia Long, whereas some Chinese in the Mekong Delta regions sided with the Khmers until the late 1790s.

The Nguyễn Lords of Vietnam had shipwrecked Chinese sailors who were blown towards Vietnam by the wind escorted safely back to China either on Vietnamese trading ships to Guangdong or from over the land border from Vietnam's Lạng Sơn province into China's Guangxi province through Zhennan Pass, where tribute envoys from Vietnam went to China. Quảng Nam Province was the site where fourth rank Chinese Brigade Vice-Commander (Dushu) Liu Sifu was shipwrecked after being blown by the wind and he was taken back to Guangzhou, China by a Vietnamese Nguyễn ship in 1669. The Vietnamese sent the Chinese Zhao Wenbin to led the diplomatic delegation on the ship and requested establishment of commercial links but the request was rejected despite Qing Chinese officials thanking the Nguyễn for repatriating the shipwrecked military officer. On Champa's coastal waters in a place called Linlangqian by the Chinese a ship ran aground after departing on 25 Jun 1682 from Cambodia carrying Chinese captain Chang Xiaoguan with a Chinese crew. Their cargo was left in the waters Chen Xiaoguan went to Thailand (Siam). This was recorded in the log of a Chinese trading junk going to Nagasaki on 25 June 1683.

A shipwrecked Chinese blown to Vietnam by the wind, Pan Dinggui in his book "Annan ji you" said that the Trinh restored the Le dynasty to power after Vietnam was struck by disease, thunder and winds when the Le was dethroned when they initially could not find Le and Tran dynasty royals to restore to the throne when he was in Vietnam in 1688. Pan also said that only the Le king was met by official diplomats from the Qing, not the Trinh lord.

19th–20th centuries 

The Thanh Nhan Chinese made their living by exporting rice to other Southeast Asian countries, and their participation increased greatly in the years during the early 18th century after the Tây Sơn rebellion. Under local laws, rice exports to other countries were tightly regulated, but the Chinese largely ignored this rule and exported rice en masse. The prices of rice witnessed an increase of 50–100% in the 1820s as a result of these exports, which irked the Nguyễn court under Emperor Minh Mạng. Minh Mạng's mandarin, Lê Văn Duyệt noticed that the Chinese had a great autonomy over trade affairs in Gia Dinh, which was partly attributed to the patronage of Trinh Hoai Duc who was serving as the governor of the province. Minh Mạng introduced a new series of measures to curb Chinese trade from 1831 onwards, and started by introducing new restrictions to which residents are banned from overseas travel, which culminated in a brief revolt among Gia Dinh's residents in 1833. The Nguyễn court also experimented with measures to assimilate the Chinese immigrants; in 1839 an edict was issued to abolish the Chinese clan associations in Vietnamese-ruled Cambodia, which proved to be ineffective. Minh Mạng's son, Thiệu Trị, introduced a new law to allow only Chinese-born immigrants to register with the Chinese clan associations, whereas their local-born male descendants are allowed to register with the Minh-Huong-xa and adorn the Vietnamese costume. The Nguyễn court also showed signs of subtle discrimination against people of Chinese origin; only one Minh Huong Chinese was promoted to a Mandarin. This sharply contrasted with the high representation of people of Chinese descent who were able to serve the Nguyễn court under Gia Long's reign.

Chinese immigration into Vietnam visibly increased following the French colonization of Vietnam from 1860 onwards following the signing of the Convention of Peking whereby the rights of Chinese to seek employment overseas were officially recognized by the Chinese, British and French authorities. Unlike their Vietnamese predecessors, the French were very receptive of these Chinese immigrants as it provided an opportunity to stimulate trade and industry, and they generally found employment as laborers or middlemen. The French established a special Immigration Bureau in 1874 requiring Chinese immigrants to register with the Chinese clan and dialect group associations and eased trade restrictions that were previously in place. Historians such as Khanh Tran viewed this as a divide-and-conquer policy, and its implementation intended to minimize the chances of any Vietnamese revolt against the French authorities. The Chinese population witnessed an exponential increase in the late 19th century and more so in the 20th century; between the 1870s and 1890s, some 20,000 Chinese settled in Cochinchina. Another 600,000 arrived in the 1920s and 1930s, and peaks in the migration patterns were especially pronounced during the 1920s and late 1940s when the effects of fighting and economic instability arising from the Chinese Civil War became pronounced.

The inter-ethnic marriage between Chinese and Vietnamese brought Chinese customs into Vietnam society. For example, crocodiles were eaten by Vietnamese while they were taboo and off-limits for Chinese. Vietnamese women who married Chinese men adopted the Chinese taboo.
 
Vietnamese women were wedded to the Chinese who helped sell Viet Minh rice.

Statehood under North Vietnam and South Vietnam: 1950–1975
At a party plenum in 1930, the Indochinese Communist Party made a statement that the Chinese were to be treated on an equal footing with the Vietnamese, specifically defining them as "The workers and laborers among the Chinese nationals are allies of the Vietnamese revolution". One year after the state of North Vietnam was established, a mutual agreement was made between the Chinese Communist Party and Communist Party of Vietnam to give ethnic Chinese living in North Vietnam Vietnamese citizenship. This process was completed by the end of the 1950s.

During the Vietnam War, the initially favorable situation of the Chinese minority in North Vietnam began to deteriorate. In 1967–1968, friction started to occur in Sino-DRV relations, because the People's Republic of China disapproved of both Hanoi's broadening cooperation with the Soviet Union and the North Vietnamese decision to start negotiations with the U.S. in Paris. Inspired by the Chinese embassy, the official newspaper of the ethnic Chinese community published a number of anti-Soviet articles until the DRV authorities replaced its editors with some more compliant cadres. Anxious to prevent Beijing from exerting a political influence on the Chinese minority.

In the early 1970s, the North Vietnamese leaders resorted to various methods of forced assimilation. At first, they sought to pressure ethnic Chinese to adopt Vietnamese citizenship, but only a handful of Hoa cadres complied, most of whom were heavily assimilated individuals anyway. Thereupon the authorities attempted to seize the Chinese passports of the ethnic Chinese under various pretexts, but most Hoa refused to give up their passports. The regime made repeated efforts to transform the Chinese minority schools into mixed Chinese-Vietnamese schools in which Hoa children were to study together with Vietnamese pupils and the curriculum was to be based on the standard North Vietnamese curriculum. The authorities ceased to hire Hoa interpreters, nor did they employ Hoa in offices that were in regular contact with foreigners. Ethnic Chinese were rarely admitted to the military, and even if they volunteered for service, they could serve only in logistical units but not in troops sent to the front in South Vietnam. Following the Battle of the Paracel Islands (a Chinese action that Hanoi disapproved), the DRV authorities started to hinder the Hoa in visiting their relatives in the PRC.

Around the same time in South Vietnam, President Ngô Đình Diệm issued a series of measures between 1955 and 1956 to integrate the ethnic Chinese into South Vietnamese society:
 7 December 1955: A nationality law was passed which automatically qualified Vietnamese residents of mixed Chinese and Vietnamese parentage as South Vietnamese citizens.
 21 August 1956: Decree 48 was passed which made all ethnic Chinese born in Vietnam South Vietnamese citizens, irrespective of their family wishes. First-generation immigrants who were born in China, however, were not allowed to apply for Vietnamese citizenship and had to apply for residential permits that were to be renewed periodically, on top of paying residential taxes.
 29 August 1956: Decree 52 was passed which required all Vietnamese citizens regardless of their ethnic origin to adopt a Vietnamese name within six months, failing which they had to pay a heavy fine.
 6 September 1956: Decree 53 was issued which prohibited all foreigners from engaging in eleven different trades, all of which were dominated by ethnic Chinese. The foreign shareholders were required to liquidate their business or transfer their ownership to Vietnamese citizens within 6 months to 1 year, and failure to do so would result in deportation or a fine of up to 5 million piastres.

As most ethnic Chinese in Vietnam were holders of ROC nationality in 1955, the measures greatly reduced the number of expatriate Chinese in South Vietnam. The fourth decree in particular had the effect of encouraging Chinese businessmen to transfer their assets to their local-born children. In 1955, the number of ROC nationals stood at 621,000, which was greatly reduced to 3,000 by 1958. The South Vietnamese government later relaxed its stance to foreign-born Chinese in 1963, and a new nationality law was passed to allow them the choice to retain their ROC nationality or adopt South Vietnamese citizenship. The following year, the Statistics Office created a new census category, "Nguoi Viet goc Hoa" (Vietnamese people of Chinese origin), whereby Vietnamese citizens of Chinese heritage were identified as such in all official documents. No further major measures were implemented to integrate or assimilate the Chinese after 1964.

Departure from Vietnam: 1975–1990
 
Following the reunification of Vietnam, the Hoa bore the brunt of socialist transformation in the South. The control and regulation of markets was one of the most sensitive and persistent problems faced by the government following the beginning of North–South integration in 1975. The government, in its doctrinaire efforts to communize the commercial, market-oriented Southern economy, faced several paradoxes. The first was the need both to cultivate and to control commercial activity by ethnic Chinese in the South, especially in Ho Chi Minh City (formerly Saigon). Chinese businesses controlled much of the economic activity in Ho Chi Minh City and South Vietnam. Following Vietnam's break with China in 1978, some Vietnamese leaders evidently feared the potential for espionage activities within the Chinese business community. On the one hand, Chinese-owned concerns controlled trade in a number of goods and services, such as pharmaceuticals, fertilizer distribution, grain milling, and foreign-currency exchange, that were supposed to be state monopolies. On the other hand, savvy Chinese entrepreneurs provided excellent access to markets for Vietnamese exports through Hong Kong and Singapore. This access became increasingly important in the 1980s as a way of circumventing the boycott on trade with Vietnam imposed by a number of Asian and Western Nations. An announcement on 24 March outlawed all wholesale trade and large business activities, which forced around 30,000 businesses to close down overnight, followed up by another that banned all private trade. Further government policies forced former owners to become farmers in the countryside or join the armed forces and fight at the Vietnam-Cambodia border and confiscated all old and foreign currencies, as well as any Vietnamese currency in excess of the US value of $250 for urban households and $150 by rural households.

While such measures were targeted at all bourgeois elements, such measures hurt Hoa the hardest and resulted in the expropriation of Hoa properties in and around major cities. Hoa communities offered widespread resistance and clashes left the streets of Cholon "full of corpses". These measures, combined with external tensions stemming from Vietnam's dispute with Cambodia and China in 1978 and 1979 caused an exodus of the majority of the Hoa, of whom more than 170,000 fled overland into the province of Guangxi, China, from the North and the remainder fled by boat from the South. China received a daily influx of 4–5,000 refugees, while Southeast Asian countries saw a wave of 5,000 boat people arriving at their shores each month. China sent unarmed ships to help evacuate the refugees but encountered diplomatic problems as the Vietnamese government denied that the Hoa suffered persecution and later refused to issue exit permits after as many as 250,000 Hoa had applied for repatriation. In an attempt to stem the refugee flow, avert Vietnamese accusations that Beijing was coercing its citizens to emigrate, and encourage Vietnam to change its policies towards ethnic Hoa, China closed off its land border in 1978. This led to a jump in the number of boat people, with as many as 100,000 arriving in other countries by the end of 1978. However, the Vietnamese government by now not only encouraged the exodus but took the opportunity to profit from it by extorting a price of five to ten taels of gold or an equivalent of US$1,500 to $3,000 per person wishing to leave the country. The Vietnamese military also forcibly drove the thousands of border refugees across the China-Vietnam land border, causing numerous border incidents and armed clashes, while blaming these movements on China by accusing them of using saboteurs to force Vietnamese citizens into China. This new influx brought the number of refugees in China to around 200,000. One family was split. An ethnic Chinese man was deported while his ethnic Vietnamese wife and child were left behind. For those who lacked the resources to pay their way out remained to face continued discrimination and ostracism, including forced retirement, reduction of food rations and exclusion from certain fields of study, a measure considered necessary for national security.

The size of the exodus increased during and after the war. The monthly number of boat people arriving in Southeast Asia increased to 11,000 during the first quarter of 1979, 28,000 by April, and 55,000 in June, while more than 90,000 fled by boat to China. In addition, the Vietnamese military also began expelling ethnic Hoa from Vietnamese-occupied Cambodia, leading to over 43,000 refugees of mostly Hoa descent fleeing overland to Thailand. By now, Vietnam was openly confiscating the properties and extorting money from fleeing refugees. In April 1979 alone, Hoa outside of Vietnam had remitted a total of US$242 million (an amount equivalent to half the total value of Vietnam's 1978 exports) through Hong Kong to Ho Chi Minh City to help their friends or family pay their way out of Vietnam. By June, money from refugees had replaced the coal industry as Vietnam's largest source of foreign exchange and was expected to reach as much as 3 billion in US dollars. By 1980, the refugee population in China reached 260,000, and the number of surviving boat people refugees in Southeast Asia reached 400,000. (An estimated 50% to 70% of Vietnamese and Chinese boat people perished at sea.)

Đổi Mới (since 1986) 
After Nguyễn Văn Linh initiated the Vietnamese economic reforms in 1986, the Hoa in Vietnam has witnessed a massive commercial resurgence and despite many years of persecution began to regain much of their power in the Vietnamese economy. The open-door policy and economic reforms of Vietnam, as well as the improved economic and diplomatic relations of Vietnam with other Southeast Asian countries, has revived the entrepreneurial presence and economic clout of the predominantly urban Hoa minority in the roles they had historically played in the Vietnamese economy.

Like much of Southeast Asia, Hoa dominate Vietnamese commerce and industry at every level of society. Before 1975, entrepreneurial savvy Chinese had literally taken over Vietnam's entire economy and have been prospering disproportionately as a result of the country's post-1988 economic liberalization vis-a-vis the Kinh majority. The Chinese have maintained a considerable presence in Vietnam's economy and have been a market-dominant minority for centuries, historically controlling the country's most lucrative commercial, trade, and industrial sectors. The economic power of the Hoa is far greater than that of their proportion would suggest relative to their small population in addition to the Chinese community being a socioeconomically successful ethhnic minority for hundreds of years than the indigenous host Kinh population. The Hoa wield tremendous economic clout over their Kinh majority counterparts and play a critical role in maintaining the country's economic vitality and prosperity prior to having their property confiscated by the Vietnamese Communists after 1975. The Hoa, a disproportionate wealthy, market-dominant minority not only form a distinct ethnic community, but they also form, by and large, an economically advantaged social class: the commercial middle and upper class in contrast to their poorer Kinh majority working and underclass counterparts around them. Today inside Vietnam, the deeply resented 1 percent Hoa minority controls as much as 70 to 80 percent of the entire country's economy and commercial wealth.

Early history and French colonial rule (3rd century BC–1945 AD)
The Hoa have played a prominent role in Vietnamese business and industry as Chinese economic dominance in Vietnam dates back to 208 B.C., when the renegade Qin Chinese military general Zhao Tuo defeated An Dương Vương, the king of Âu Lạc in north Vietnam, and conquered the Âu Lạc Kingdom, an ancient Vietnamese state situated in the northern mountains of modern Vietnam populated by the ancient Lạc Việt and Âu Việt. Zhao annexed Âu Lạc into the Qin Empire the following year and declared himself the emperor of Nam Viet. A century later, a militarily powerful Han dynasty annexed Nanyue (which in Chinese translates to "land of the southern barbarians") into the Han Empire and was ruled as a province for the next several centuries. Sinification of Nanyue was brought about by a combination of Han imperial military power, regular settlement, and an influx of Han Chinese refugees, officers and garrisons, merchants, scholars, bureaucrats, fugitives, and prisoners of war. By the end of the 17th century, a distinct Han Chinese community, known as the Hoa, had formed within Vietnamese society. Hoa enclaves and small Chinatowns took root in every major Vietnamese city and trading center. Large congregations of Han Chinese immigrants coupled with their economic power allowed the establishment of various institutions to regulate their commercial business activities as well as to look out and safeguard their economic interests. Modern Han Chinese settlement and immigration in Vietnam came about from conducive opportunities for trade and business as Han Chinese migrant businessmen began to visit Hội An from the 16th century onward and initially traded black incense, silk, alum, and traditional Chinese medicinal products with the indigenous Kinh populace. Dutch, Portuguese, and French merchants who visited Hội An in the 17th century brought high-quality European-made brass utensils that attracted the attention of Chinese merchants. In turn, other Hoa manufactured goods such as porcelain, silver bars, and various metals were traded. Around this time, the Hoa began to establish their own trading and social associations, the latter of which is referred to as bang in Vietnamese to protect their own economic interests. The bang also provided various welfare services for newly settled Chinese immigrants, including financial services such as the collection of taxes. As more Han Chinese immigrants poured in by the 19th century, the bang served as meeting points and nodes for Chinese community leaders to band together to pool seed capital and establish their own businesses. At their disposal were guilds and business cooperatives that enabled the Hoa to conduct business more efficiently and fluidly with higher quality information and greater levels of social trust and entrepreneurial cooperation. In addition, Hoa entrepreneurs established Overseas Chinese business contacts, adduced reasonable bargains and deals to entice and maintain customer satisfaction, as well as put in extra hours by conscientiously working harder on a relentless basis to gain a competitive business edge over their French and Kinh counterparts. A mild business temperament, astute business-making decisions, coupled with a preference for earning small profit gains over a long period of time rather than to make a quick buck in the short term were also major factors that allowed the Chinese to prevail economically in Vietnam. 

The Hoa were notoriously enterprising entrepreneurs that traded and manufactured a myriad of goods and services of value ranging from fine Chinese silk to black incense. The monopolized gold export trade was entirely under Chinese hands in addition to the Chinese domination of local trade in paper, tea, pepper, arms, sulfur, lead, and lead oxide. The economic clout wielded by the Hoa coupled with repeated military incursions and other invasive attempts by successive Chinese dynasties to conquer and dominate Vietnam inflamed anti-Chinese sentiment, hostility, bitterness, envy, and resentment from their Kinh counterparts. Nonetheless, Chinese economic dominance continued to surge unswervingly following the establishment of the Nguyễn dynasty in 1802. As wealthy Chinese merchants and investors served as a source of tax revenue and political interests of the Nguyen mandarin officials. By the time the French arrived in the mid-18th century, the Hoa dominated the Kinh majority in trade, mining, and every urban market sector in addition to prospering under the colonial laissez-faire market policies enshrined by the French colonialists. Vietnam's gold industry in particular, was monopolized entirely by Chinese merchants. The Hoa also monopolized the entire internal gold procurement and distribution system as the French colonial regime saw the advantage of market expertise offered by the Chinese and allowed Chinese merchants to freely engage in external trade; sometimes leading to a certain amount of cooperation between the French and Chinese in both the import and export sectors. The French would shrewdly cultivate and champion Chinese entrepreneurship as the French colonial administrators welcomed Chinese immigrants and saw the valuable significance within the Chinese community's entrepreneurial acumen that was imperative for the predicated sustentation of French colonial rule as well as its corresponding economic prosperity that was submerged within it. The Hoa population rose from 25,000 in the 1860s to more than 200,000 in 1911. In addition, Hoa businessmen also served as intermediaries by operating as agents for the French as well as their own. Hoa businessmen also collaborated with the French and other European capitalists in tapping the riches of Vietnam's natural resource endowments and exploiting the indigenous Kinh via the laissez-faire economic system at the expense of the Kinh in order to enrich themselves. During the French colonial era, imports were completely under the control of the French authorities, as was nearly all the major import items such as machinery, transport equipment, building materials, and luxury goods that were undertaken by French companies, while the Hoa operated as intermediaries for the French colonial authorities in exchange for a commission.

Chợ Lớn or Big Market during the late nineteenth-century was a major business epicenter for Hoa entrepreneurs and investors as it was the place that was at the center of Hoa economic influence in Vietnam at that time. However, obtrusive resentment and pronounced hostility directed against Chinese economic success in the vicinity sparked recurrent anti-Hoa reprisals, including the infamous 1782 massacre of some 2000 Hoa in Cholon's Chinatown. The 1782 massacre in which an estimated ten thousand Hoa were mercilessly slaughtered. According to official Vietnamese records, Chinese-owned shops were burned and looted, and the victims, including "men, women, and children," were indiscriminately "killed and their corpses were thrown into the river." During the French colonial epoch, Chợ Lớn was well-known for its extensive rice endowments, which was a leading source of wealth that formed much of the success of capital accumulation among Hoa-owned rice processing enterprises. Under French rule, the collection of rice paddies in the Mekong delta was completely under Chinese hands who resold it to French companies for export. Industrial commodities imported from France by French companies in Vietnam were retailed to the rural Kinh populace in the South by Hoa merchants, with some of them holding exclusive distribution rights. In 1865, Hoa rice merchants in Cholon created contacts with the Hong Kong and Shanghai Bank to export rice and other agricultural products to Qing China. By 1874, there were fourteen rice exporting companies owned by the Hoa competing with ten European import-export businesses. The Grain Merchants Association with its headquarters in Cholon had direct contracts with rice markets in Taiwan, British Hong Kong, Meiji Japan, Thailand, and British Malaya. Seeing the vast opportunities for profitability that could be potentially exploited from Chợ Lớn's rice trade, Hoa rice merchants began to compete with American and European businessmen for business primacy by vying to capture potential significant shares of Vietnam's then-emerging rice trading market. As Hoa rice merchants wanted a piece of Vietnam's rice trade for themselves, they began to establish their own rice trading networks between 1878 to 1886 across South Vietnam with financial backing coming from Overseas Chinese investors in Malacca, Penang, Singapore, and Hong Kong. Though the Hoa rice merchants were pitted in direct competition against their American and European counterparts, the Hoa controlled seven of the nine rice mills built in Chợ Lớn between 1905 to 1914. From 1905 to 1918, the Hoa controlled 36 out of the 41 total rice mills in Chợ Lớn. With Chợ Lớn being the center of Vietnam's economic heartland during the 19th and 20th centuries,  Chợ Lớn in the contemporary era today continues to remain and serve as one of contemporary Vietnam's most leading economic nerve centers for the Hoa business community.     
          
With the strong presence of the Chinese in Vietnam's economic life during the early part of the twentieth century, the Hoa emerged as a prosperous economic minority and established themselves the country's leading entrepeneurs and investors as their disproportionately high levels of socioeconomic success made them practically inseparable from the Vietnamese economy. In the fishing sector, the Hoa maintained a strong foothold, particularly in deep-sea fishing. Stiff competition and high rates of attrition between the Hoa fishermen displaced their indigenous Kinh counterparts away from the local fish export trade. As a result of cutthroat competition between the Hoa fishermen, even the production of Nuac Mann, a popular Vietnamese fish sauce ended up being monopolized by them. The Chinese also owned sugar refineries, construction equipment, and industrial machinery manufacturing establishments as well as their own rice and sawmills. Other Hoa entrepreneurs participated in the textile, cotton, sugar, condiment, silk, cinnamon bark, cardamom, and tea trade. Many Hoa also delved into coconut and peanut oil production and began their humble business careers as lowly menial laborers on French rubber plantations and eventually worked their way up to start their own tea, pepper, and rice plantations to supply the domestic Vietnamese market. Hoa gardeners monopolized the grocery stores in the suburban areas of Saigon and Chinese-owned restaurants and hotels began to germinate in every urban Vietnamese market center. In 1906, Hoa and French businessmen together generated a total capital output of 222 million francs, compared to 2 million francs for the indigenous Kinh majority. The first steam-operated rice milling enterprise owned by the Chinese came into being in 1876 in Cholon. By the end of the nineteenth century, the Hoa controlled five of the eight rice milling factories in Saigon-Cholon. In 1920, they expanded to 13 out of the 20 rice mills, and by the 1930s, the Chinese ended up controlling 75 of the 94 rice mills. By the 1930s, niches and gaps between the large-scale manufacturing establishments, commercial, plantation, and financial services businesses held by the French were filled by smaller businesses controlled by the Chinese. Auspicious economic policies attracted a rapid influx of Chinese immigrants who sought to unlock their financial destinies through business success until the mid-twentieth century. Between 1925 and 1933, some 600,000 Han Chinese immigrants settled in Vietnam. Between 1923 and 1951, as many as 1.2 million Chinese emigrants moved from China to Vietnam. Hoa merchants delved into the rice, liquor, opium, and spice trade, where they set up plantations in the rural hinterlands of the Mekong delta and sold their products in Cholon. In the north, the Hoa were mainly rice farmers, fishermen, and coal miners, except for those residing in cities and provincial towns. The French regularly collaborated with Chinese businessmen in the agricultural and heavy industry sectors, and the latter often served as middlemen to liaise between themselves and the French in the domestic trade sector.

South Vietnamese rule (1945–1975)
By the 1950s, the Hoa had held enormous sway on Vietnam's economic life as the concomitant brunt that came with the societal implications of wielding such vast amounts of economic power, the Chinese community was stereotypically viewed as "a state within a state", forming a more distinct cosmopolitan and wealthier population than the host indigenous Kinh majority. The pronounced economic success of the Hoa ‌inflamed and incurred the wrath, resentment, envy, animosity, and outright hostility from their Kinh counterparts. The Hoa had a huge propensity to voluntarily segregate themselves from the Kinh, typically associating themselves with the Chinese community at large, attending Chinese institutions, marrying within the Han Chinese community, while projecting a sense of Han "superiority", "clannishness", while unabashedly affirming a distinctive sense of their own Han "ethnic identity, nationalism, and cultural exclusivity" against their Kinh majority counterparts. After the French colonial authorities withdrew from Vietnam in the 1950s, the Ngo Dinh Diem government tried to Vietnamize the economy and reduce the amount of Hoa and French participation while trying to increase the amount Vietnamese economic participation to gain a proportionate foothold relative to their population size. Inauspiciously, Kinh entrepreneurs were unable to compete against their Hoa counterparts and ultimately went bust and folded due to a deficiency of capital and weak business ties outside Vietnam.  

In 1961, the Hoa controlled 80 percent of all the capital in Vietnam's retail trade and 75 percent of the entire nation's commercial activities. Utilizing the Confucian paradigm of personal networks, the Hoa dominated several types of businesses such as financial services, food, information technology, chemicals, electronic and electrical equipment, machinery, fabricated metals, wholesale trade, transportation equipment, and other miscellaneous services. Constituting a mere 1 percent of Vietnam's population, the Hoa controlled an estimated 90 percent of non-European private capital in the mid-1960s and dominated Vietnam's entire retail trade, financial services provisions, manufacturing establishments, transportation sectors, and all aspects of the country's rice trade. In the hospitality industry, the Hoa owned more than 50 percent of all the largest hotels and 90 percent of small hotels and boarding houses in the Saigon-Cholon and Gia Dinh areas respectively, in addition to 92 large restaurants, 243 tea and beer shops, 48 hotels, and 826 eateries. Furthermore, the Chinese controlled much of the restaurants, drink and hotels, amusement and recreation, medical, educational, and other miscellaneous establishments. In particular, Hoa businessmen operated restaurants and hotels as a launchpad to eventually scale up and venture out into other businesses since these businesses turned in a quick profit while requiring negligible amounts of startup capital to take off. Furthermore, due to the lack of bureaucratic red tape, hospitality companies were not regulated by the Vietnamese government nor were they subject to local discriminatory policies. Although there were also numerous wealthy Kinh in the commercial class, the vast disproportion of economic power were still remained concentrated in the hands of the Hoa minority, incurring the resentment, jealousy, envy, and hostility from the Kinh majority.

The Hoa were also the pioneers of the Vietnamese financial services industry, being the key corporate masterminds that played a major role behind the emergence of some of Vietnam's early banking houses and esteemed financial institutions. Early in the twentieth century, the Franco-Chinese bank was jointly established by French and Hoa businessmen and investors in Saigon-Cholon. After the inauguration of the bank, initial capital swelled from 10 million to 50 million francs within the span of half a decade. After reaping the teachings of sound Western banking practices under French tutelage, the Chinese community would capitalize on their learned knowledge and experience to soon go on to establish their own banks, providing seed capital to Hoa rice merchants in addition to bankrolling their own pawnshops. During the early years of the Republic of Vietnam, the Chinese controlled three of the ten private banks while the rest were British and French-owned. Furthermore, the Hoa also controlled foreign branches of banks based in Mainland China such as the Bank of China, Bank of Communications, and Bank of East Asia, all of which had a direct presence in pioneering Vietnam's banking sector. In South Vietnam, 28 of the 32 banks were controlled by the Hoa and the amount of capital under Chinese hands accounted for 49 percent of the total capital invested in eleven local private banks in 1974. Additionally, the Chinese also ran the bank's Chinese Affairs Office to serve the needs of the Hoa business community. One high-profile success story within the pioneering of Vietnam's banking industry is owed to the Hoa banker and businessman, Đặng Văn Thành. Thành who established Sacombank in 1991, has since then emerged as one of Vietnam's leading banks eventually becoming the first bank to be listed on the Ho Chi Minh Stock Exchange in December 2006. Today, Sacombank deals with many banking industry constituents such as operating as a wealth management house, investment bank, corporate financial advisory, brokerage, and private equity firm. On August 10, 2007, Thành fulfilled his pledge to the Hoa community by inaugurating a Sacombank branch for them called Hoa-Viet Branch. The specialized bank branch located in the Chinatown district of Ho Chi Minh City serves a financial services institution that specifically deals with Hoa clients and addresses the local banking needs of the Hoa community in Mandarin. Thành, a second-generation Hoa of Hainanese ancestry on his father's side, began his humble business career by operating several small factories that made sugar cane, cooking wine, and cattle feed. Thành then ventured out into the banking sector when he assumed the position as the Chairman of the Thành Công banking cooperative and joining Sacombank's board of directors in 1993, where he was then promoted as Chairman two years later. The expansion of the bank and its subsequent success formed much of Thành's individual and private family fortune as his family was ranked as one of the top ten wealthiest in Vietnam in 2008. 2014 was a major breakout year for Sacombank as it announced its merger with another bank by the name of Southern Bank, which is owned by Trầm Bê, a fellow Hoa banker and businessman of Teochew ancestry. Today, Thành's wife and children play a major role in conducting and operating the family's day-to-day business activities, which have since then expanded into real estate and brewing. Of the five women that make up Thành's immediate and extended family, possess an aggregate net worth of 2,178 billion đồng (136.12 million USD$).

In 1970, it was estimated that while the Hoa made up only 5.3 percent of the total population, but reputedly controlled 70 to 80 percent of the entire  country's commercial sector. In 1971, the Chinese controlled 2492 shops, equivalent to 41 percent of all the small and medium-sized shops operated in Saigon-Cholon's nine districts. In addition, the Hoa controlled the entire wholesale trade and 50 percent of the retail trade of South Vietnam before 1975. Apropos to exports, Hoa businessmen established their own business networks with their compatriots in Mainland China and other Overseas Chinese business community counterparts in Southeast Asia. Chinese-owned businesses controlled much of the economic activity in Saigon in South Vietnam where Hoa controlled 80 percent of South Vietnam's overall industry despite making up a tiny percentage of South Vietnam's population. Prior to the Fall of Saigon, the Chinese controlled 40.9 percent of the small-scale enterprises, 100 percent of the wholesale trade in South Vietnam, transitioning from smaller-scale retail outlets to larger wholesale enterprises. Chinese enterprises made up 45.6 percent of all the enterprises handling the import trade in the early 1970s. In addition 815 of the 966 direct and indirect importers in 1971 were controlled by the Chinese along with 300 Chinese shipping lines in Ho Chi Minh City alone as well as fifty large Chinese agents for agricultural, sea, and forestry products. By 1974, Chinese investment in the amusement and recreation sector was 20 percent and made up 80 percent of the total investment in the medical and health services industry. At the end of 1974, the Hoa controlled more than 80 percent of the food, textile, chemical, metallurgy, engineering, and electrical industries, 100 percent of wholesale trade, more than 50 percent of retail trade, and 90 percent of the export-import trade. Dominance over the economy enabled the Hoa to "manipulate prices" of rice and other scarce goods. During the Vietnam War, the wealth of the Hoa increased dramatically and intensified as they seized lucrative business opportunities that came with the arrival of the American troops, who needed a trade and services network to serve their military needs. The war prompted the South Vietnamese government to gradually deregulate the economy, adopting relatively liberal market policies that caused the local Hoa to exploit local business opportunities as well as extending their economic dominance into the light industry. Throughout the war, Hoa took advantage of U.S. aid and expanded not only their trade and services networks but also their operations in other business domains. The Chinese controlled nearly all the key sectors of South Vietnam's economy such as trade, industry, banking, communications, and transportation. Of more than $100 billion poured into the war effort by the United States, a disproportionately vast amount ended up in the hands of the Chinese, effectively enriching the Hoa minority and intensifying the wealth and economic power held in Chinese hands. In 1972, Hoa owned 28 of the 32 banks in South Vietnam, handled more than 60 percent of the total volume of goods imported into South Vietnam through American aid, and comprised 84 percent of the direct and indirect shipping importers. The Hoa controlled nearly two-thirds of the amount of cash in circulation, 80 percent of the processing industry, 80 percent of the fixed assets in manufacturing, 100 percent of the wholesale trade, 50 percent of the retail trade, and 90 percent of the export and import trade. Hoa completely monopolized 100 percent of the grain trade and obtained 80 percent of the credits from South Vietnamese banks, as well as owning 42 out of the 60 companies with a turnover of more than 1 billion piasters including major banks, and accounted for two-thirds of the total annual investments in the South. Hoa were responsible for generating 75 percent of the commercial economic output in South Vietnam in 1975, including controlling 100 percent of the domestic wholesale trade, 80 percent of the industry, 70 percent of the foreign trade, and presided over half the country's retail trade. With the Hoa's pervasive economic grasp in the palm of their hands in the South, some 117 of the 670 leading Southern Vietnamese business families were of Chinese ancestry.

As Hoa entrepreneurs in South Vietnam became more financially prosperous, they often pooled large amounts of seed capital and started joint business ventures with expatriate Mainland and Overseas Chinese businessmen and investors from all over the world. Like other Southeast Asian businesses owned by those of Chinese ancestry, Chinese-owned businesses in Vietnam often foster corporate partnerships with Greater Chinese and other Overseas Chinese businesses across the globe in search of new business opportunities to collaborate and concentrate on. Besides sharing a common ancestral background in addition to similar cultural, linguistic, and familial ties, many Hoa businessmen and investors are particular strong adherents of the Confucian paradigm of interpersonal relationships when doing business with each other, as the Chinese believed that the underlying source for entrepreneurial and investment success relied on the cultivation of personal relationships. Moreover, Vietnamese businesses that are Chinese-owned form a part of the larger bamboo network, a business network of Overseas Chinese companies operating in the markets of Greater China and Southeast Asia that share common family, ethnic, linguistic, and cultural ties. Hoa have also acted as agents for expatriate Mainland and Overseas Chinese investors outside of Vietnam that act as their underlying providers of economic intelligence. Under the Saigon administration, a rapid horde of expatriate Chinese businessmen and investors from Macau, Hong Kong, and Taiwan came to South Vietnam in search of new business and investment opportunities. The Hoa compradore bourgeoisie in South Vietnam also had the economic and political backing of wealthy expatriate Chinese businessmen from Taiwan and Hong Kong and Overseas Chinese investors in the United States and other countries in Southeast Asia. In addition, the prominent Hoa compradore bourgeoisie was often seen colluding and mingling with Saigon government officials and the South Vietnamese army elite to attain even greater wealth. Moreover, Hoa business networks adhering through the Confucian paradigm of guanxi or personal relationships cooperate with extended family members to marshal capital, make use of technology, and establish distribution networks. In addition, Hoa business networks employ business negotiations in casual settings that go down during Hoa community activities hosted by Hoa-based associations and guilds. Philanthropy is also a major tenet with wealthy Hoa businesspeople often conferring generously charitable donations to the community's less fortunate as well as providing them startup financial and social capital to establish their own respective businesses. In a historical sense, the success of Hoa-owned enterprises was mainly due to the heavy premium on the businesses being family-oriented, trust-based networks, latitude towards ethnic Han internationalization, and patronage towards the Chinese community. Much like the bamboo network, Hoa-owned businesses and business networks following Đổi Mới center on family management where the company's senior management teams work in unison with the founder's relatives to maintain the organization's day-to-day corporate activities. Many of the founders come from humble beginnings, starting out as physical laborers and establishing their own businesses borrowing and scraping meager sums of startup seed capital from their families and gradually pass down the business to the next generation.

Until the 1960s, the Hoa alongside their Overseas Chinese counterparts dominated Vietnam's garment and textile industries with the nation's 600 small and medium sized textile businesses and top 3 textile manufacturing firms Vinatex; Vinatexco; and Vinatefico being under Chinese hands that supplied up to four-fifths of the entire nation's aggregate textile products. The Hoa also dominated Vietnam's processing sectors such as the cooking oil, dairy, cosmetics, plastics, and rubber industries in addition to controlling 80 percent of the largest metallurgical factories in South Vietnam. With much of the buzz surrounding the success of Chinese retail merchant trade, centrally integral to the fundamentals of that success were attributed to the development of extensive systems of canals allowing Chinese merchant traders to exert their economic clout and maintain their monopoly on Vietnam's shipping industry. Hoa retail merchants also controlled the wholesale trades in Binh Tay, An Dong and Soai Kinh Lam and were behind three-fifths of the retail goods that were distributed throughout Southern Vietnam. In Vietnamese business circles, the Hoa were dubbed as "crownless kings", "rice kings", "gasoline kings", or "scrap-iron kings" with regard to their shrewd business acumen and investment prowess. Highly publicized profiles of wealthy Hoa businessmen and investors often attracted great public interest and were used to illustrate the Chinese community's strong economic clout throughout the country. The huge materials supply chain system ensured maximum support for Han Chinese businesspeople complete access to whatever goods and services they provided for sale to their clientele. The market was allegedly calibrated so as to ensure maximum profits and manipulated prices through import-export and transport systems. One of the most notorious of South Vietnam's Hoa compradore bourgeoisie was a businessman and investor by the name of Ly Long Than, who reportedly held a diverse portfolio of business assets as the owner of 18 major commercial and industrial manufacturing establishments (Vinatexco and Vinafilco textile factories, Vinatefinco dye-works, Vicasa steel factory, Nakydaco edible oil factory) in addition to presiding the Rang Dong shipping line, a real estate holding company, a plush hotel, an insurance agency, a chain of restaurants, as well as being a controlling shareholder in sixteen Vietnamese banks including the Vietnamese branches of the Bank of China and the Agricultural Bank of China respectively, and the Agriculture Industry Commerce Bank. Foreign investors and visitors conducting business in Cholon would recall seeing the plethora of Chinese-owned import-export shipping giants, banks, modern high-rise buildings, plush hotels, bars, nightclubs, and restaurants all controlled by Hoa businessmen and investors. Other notable Hoa compradore bourgeoisie investors include Hoan Kim Quy, a native of Hanoi where he presided over a prominent shipping line and derived his fortune from barbed wire manufacturing, the operation of a large textile and appliance import company, a gold mining concession, and a trading cooperative. He also served as the Director of the Vitaco shipping line and was a major shareholder in several Vietnamese banks.

The control and regulation of markets were one of the most sensitive, controversial, and persistent political issues faced by the Vietnamese revolutionary government following the beginning of North-South integration in 1975. The government, in its doctrinaire efforts to nationalize the commercial, market-oriented Southern economy, faced several paradoxes. The first was the need both to cultivate and to curtail the heavy presence of commercial business activity controlled by Hoa Chinese in the South, especially in Ho Chi Minh City, as Chinese-owned businesses controlled much of the commercial economic activity in Ho Chi Minh City and the South in general. Following the break with China in 1978, some Vietnamese political leaders evidently feared the potential for espionage activities within the Chinese business community. On the one hand, Chinese-owned concerns controlled trade in a number of commodities and services, such as pharmaceuticals, fertilizer distribution, grain milling, and foreign-currency exchanges, businesses that were ostensibly presumed to be state-owned monopolies. On the other hand, Hoa businessmen also provided excellent access to international markets for Vietnamese exports through Hong Kong and Singapore. Such access became increasingly important in the 1980s as a way of circumventing the boycott on trade with Vietnam imposed by a number of Continental Asian and Western nations. The Hoa have dominated several types of businesses such as selling rice, crewed junk, rice transportation, and shipbuilding during their early arrival to Vietnam. Through enterprise, organization, and cooperation, many Chinese became part of a garishly prosperous, urban middle and upper class that controlled the country's entire retail trade. Chinese retail outlets filled every major Vietnamese town and sea route as rice selling and transportation were one of the most lucrative businesses that generated some of the highest profit margins and returns on equity in the country. In addition, the Hoa business community became economically dominant in Saigon, where the Han Chinese worked as vendors and peddled an array of products as an industrious entrepreneurial and business-savvy ethnic group, being responsible for generating much of the city's economic output and commercial business activities. Many budding and up-and-coming Hoa entrepreneurs and investors started off working as butchers and tailors and then ventured into confectionery while other Hoas began their business careers by working as money changers, lenders, bankers, who sold products such as tea, porcelain, pharmaceuticals and medicine, furniture, and cabinet-work on the side that were shipped to Vietnam from China. Southern Vietnamese politicians said the Han Chinese in Cholon also remained active in municipal politics and the Vietnamese Communist Party, but maintained their primary interest of focus of entrepreneurship, business, and investing. Regardless of the Vietnamese political climate, the Chinese felt secure when partaking in business in everyday public life as well as engaging activities that improved and enriched their social and cultural lives in private. About 20 percent of the 6,000 private companies and 150,000 individual small businesses in the city were Chinese-run, as their commercial activities accounted for more than 30 percent of Ho Chi Minh City's business output due to better equipment used by the businesses.

Prior to 1975, the influx of Chinese investment capital, entrepreneurship, and skilled manpower in South Vietnam played an important role in the development of Vietnam's domestic markets and international trade. In South Vietnam, Hoa controlled more than 90 percent of the non-European capital, 80 percent of the food, textile, chemical, metallurgy, engineering, and electrical industries, 100 percent of the wholesale trade, more than 50 percent of the retail trade, and 90 percent of the import-export trade. The sheer economic dominance presided by the Hoa prompted accusations from the Kinh majority who felt that they could not compete against Chinese-owned businesses. With the Hoa's economic clout, it was noted by 1983 that more than 60 percent of southern Vietnam's bourgeoisie were of Han Chinese ancestry. The Chinese controlled the entire rice paddy market and obtained up to 80 percent of the bank loans in the south. Furthermore, Hoa entrepreneurs and investors also owned 42 of the 60 corporations having a large annual turnover of more than 1 million dong and their investments accounted for two-thirds of the total investment in South Vietnam.

Reunification and Doi Moi (1975–present)
Following Vietnam's reunification in 1976, the socialist and revolutionary Vietnamese government began using the Hoa as a scapegoat for their socio-economic woes. The revolutionary government referred to the enterprising Chinese as "bourgeois" and perpetrators of "world capitalism." Brutal draconian policies instituted against the Chinese involved the "Employing the techniques Hitler used to inflame hatred against the Jews" as reported by the U.S. News and World Report'''s Ray Wallace in 1979, led many Hoa being persecuted by fleeing the country or succumbing to death after laboring in Vietnam's so-called "new economic zones." Despite undergoing many years of persecution by the socialist Vietnamese government, the Hoa have begun to reassert and regain much of their economic grip that they previously held in the Vietnamese economy. Since the early 1980s, the Vietnamese government has gradually reintegrated the Chinese community into laying the groundwork for Vietnam's mainstream economic development. By 1986, the Hoa were actively encouraged to take part in parlaying the economic development of Vietnam. Since then, the Hoa have once again begun contributing significantly to the expansion of Vietnamese internal markets and capital accumulation for small-scale industrial business development. In the 1990s, the commercial role and influence of Hoa in Vietnam's economy have rebounded substantially since the introduction of Doi Moi as the Vietnamese government's post-1988 shift to a capitalist-based free-market liberalization has led to an astounding resurgence of Chinese economic dominance across the country's urban areas. Across the country, enterprising Hoa entrepreneurs and investors have re-asserted their previous economic influence. In Ho Chi Minh City alone, Hoa entrepreneurs are responsible for generating 50 percent of the city's commercial market activity as well as having percolated their economic primacy into cornering Vietnam's light industry, import-export trade, shopping malls, and private banking sector. In 1996, Hoa entrepreneurs continued to dominate Vietnam's private industry and were responsible for generating an estimated $4 billion in business output, making up one-fifth of Vietnam's aggregate domestic business output.

Modern population
The official census from 2019 accounted the Hoa population at 749,466 individuals and ranked 9th in terms of its population size. 70% of the Hoa live in cities and towns in which they make up the largest minority group, mostly in Ho Chi Minh city while the remainder live in the countryside in the southern provinces. The Hoa had constituted the largest ethnic minority group in the mid 20th century and its population had previously peaked at 1.2 million, or about 2.6% of Vietnam's population in 1976 a year following the end of the Vietnam War. Just 3 years later, the Hoa population dropped to 935,000 as large swathes of Hoa left Vietnam. The 1989 census indicated the Hoa population had appreciated to 960,000 individuals, but their proportion had dropped to 1.5% by then. In 1999, the Hoa population at some 860,000 individuals, or approximately 1.1% of the country's population and by then, were ranked Vietnam's 4th largest ethnic group. The Hoa population are mainly concentrated in Cochinchina, and a 1943 census indicated that they made up the bulk (89%) of the Hoa population of Vietnam, or about 7% of Cochinchina's population.

Ancestral affiliations
The Hoa trace their ancestral origins to different parts of China many centuries ago and they are identified based on the dialects that they speak. In cities where large Chinese communities exist such as Ho Chi Minh City, Chinese communities set up clan associations that identify themselves based on surnames or their ancestral homeland. In southern Vietnam, five different bang'' or clans are traditionally recognized within the Hoa community: Quảng (Cantonese), Tiều (Teochew), Hẹ (Hakka), Phúc Kiến (Hokkien) and Hải Nam (Hainanese), with the Cantonese forming the largest group. Each of these Hoa sub-groups tends to congregate in different towns and one dialect group may predominate over the others.

Diaspora communities

Today, there are many Hoa communities in Australia, Canada, France, United Kingdom and the United States, where they have reinvigorated old existing Chinatowns. For example, the established Chinatowns of Los Angeles, San Francisco, New York City, Houston, Chicago, Dallas, Toronto, Honolulu and Paris have a Vietnamese atmosphere due to the large presence of Hoa people.

Orange County is also home to a significant Hoa diaspora community, along with Cabramatta, New South Wales, Australia.

The Chinese Vietnamese population in China now number up to 300,000, and live mostly in 194 refugee settlements mostly in the provinces of Guangdong, Guangxi, Hainan, Fujian, Yunnan and Jiangxi. More than 85% have achieved economic independence, but the remainder live below the poverty line in rural areas. While they have most of the same rights as Chinese nationals, including employment, education, housing, property ownership, pensions, and health care, they had not been granted citizenship and continued to be regarded by the government as refugees. Their refugee status allowed them to receive UN High Commissioner for Refugees (UNHCR) assistance and aid until the early 21st century. In 2007, the Chinese government began drafting legislation to grant full Chinese citizenship to Indochinese refugees, including the ethnic Hoa which make up the majority, living within its borders.

Genetics

Notable Hoa people

Historical people
 Lý Tài, merchant pirate who became a general of Nguyễn Lords and the Vietnamese Ruler Le Thanh Tong.
 Trần Văn Lắm, President of the Vietnamese senate and minister for foreign affairs for the Republic of Vietnam during the height of the Vietnam War
 Lai Teck, leader of the Communist Party of Malaya and Malayan People's Anti-Japanese Army 
 Lâm Quang Thi, Lieutenant General of Army of the Republic of Vietnam during the Vietnam War
 Lê Văn Viễn, Major General of the Vietnamese National Army and head of Bình Xuyên, a powerful Vietnamese crime syndicate
 Nguyễn Lạc Hoá, refugee nationalist Catholic priest, leader of the "Nung fighters" in Cà Mau during the Vietnam War (Originally from Guangxi, China)

Celebrities
 Lý Hùng, Vietnamese vovinam artist, actor, film director, producer, entrepreneur, philanthropist, activist, and singer
 Lương Bích Hữu, Vietnamese actress and pop singer
 Tăng Thanh Hà, Vietnamese actress and model (Real Name: Tăng Thị Thanh Hà)
 Lam Trường, Vietnamese singer (Real Name: Tiêu Lam Trường)
 Tống Anh Tỷ, Vietnamese footballer who plays as a central midfielder for V-League club Becamex Bình Dương
 Trấn Thành, MC and artist

Hoa diaspora
 Frank Jao, American businessman
 Carol Huynh, Canadian wrestler
 Chi Muoi Lo, actor, writer, director, and producer
 Chau Giang, American poker player, three-time World Series of Poker bracelet winner and three-time final tablist of the World Poker Tour
 Frank Jao, prominent American businessman in Southern California
 Jack Lee, American celebrity chef
 Eric Ly, American entrepreneur, investor and co-founder of LinkedIn
 Ching Hai, spiritual leader of the Guanyin Famen (Chinese) or Quan Yin Method transnational cybersect (Real Name: Hue Dang Trinh)
 Ray Lui Leung-Wai, Hong Kong actor, famous for his role in TVB Classic, The Bund
 Pauline Chan, Australian actress, director, screenwriter, and producer
 Jeannie Mai, American television host, make-up artist, and stylist
 Jennifer Pan, Canadian woman who committed matricide
 Eliza Sam, Canadian actress
 Vico Thai, Australian actor
 Priscilla Chan, philanthropist and spouse of Mark Zuckerberg
 Ke Huy Quan, American Academy award-winning actor and stunt choreographer
 Tsui Hark, Hong Kong film director, producer, and screenwriter
 Wan Kwong, Hong Kong singer, known as "The Temple Street Prince" (Real Name: Lui Minkwong)
 Wong Kwok-hing, Hong Kong trade unionist and a former member of the Legislative Council of Hong Kong

See also

 China–Vietnam relations
 Demographics of Vietnam
 Hoa people in Ho Chi Minh City
 Indochina refugee crisis
 List of ethnic groups in Vietnam

Notes

References

Bibliography

English
 
 
  
 
 

 
 

 
 
 
  Page: 33 & 34. Wikipedia: World on Fire: How Exporting Free Market Democracy Breeds Ethnic Hatred and Global Instability
 
 
 
 
 
 
 
 

 
 
 
 
 
 
 
 
  

 

 

 
 
 
 
 
 
 
 
 
 
 
 
 

  
  
 
 
 
 
 
 
 
 
 

 
 
 
 
 
  
  
 
  eBook: .

Chinese

Vietnamese

External links 
 
 Chinese Affairs Department of Ho Chi Minh City 
 Photo album

 
 
Ethnic groups in Vietnam